Sammuel Lamur (born June 8, 1989) is an American football quarterback who is currently a free agent. He was signed by the Tampa Bay Storm as an undrafted free agent in 2014 as a quarterback. He played college football at Kansas State University. He is the twin brother of Minnesota Vikings linebacker, Emmanuel Lamur. He was signed by the Tampa Bay Buccaneers to play linebacker on August 6, 2015. He was waived on August 11, 2015.

Personal life
Lamur is of Haitian descent. He is the twin brother of current Free agent linebacker Emmanuel Lamur.

References

External links
Tampa Bay Buccaneers bio
Kansas State bio
Arena Football League bio

1989 births
Living people
American football quarterbacks
American football linebackers
Kansas State Wildcats football players
Tampa Bay Storm players
Independence Pirates football players
Tampa Bay Buccaneers players